Petit-Tenquin (Lorraine Franconian: Klä-Tenschen/Klän Tensche) is a commune in the Moselle department in Grand Est in north-eastern France.

See also
 Communes of the Moselle department

References

External links
 

Petittenquin